HIA may refer to:

Airports
 Hamad International Airport, in Doha, Qatar
 Harrisburg International Airport, in Pennsylvania, United States
 Huai'an Lianshui Airport (IATA: HIA), in Jiangsu Province, China

Organizations 
 Hauppauge Industrial Association, an American trade organization
 Health Initiative of the Americas, an advocacy group in California
 Hemp Industries Association, a North American trade organization
 Housing Industry Association, an Australian trade organization
 Northern Ireland Historical Institutional Abuse Inquiry or HIA Inquiry

Other uses 
 Hampton-in-Arden railway station,  England, station code
 Health impact assessment
 Health Insurance Associate, a designation from America's Health Insurance Plans.
 Hendrik-Ido-Ambacht, town in the Netherlands
 Herzberg Institute of Astrophysics
 Hia (magazine), an Arabic women's magazine
 Higher Intelligence Agency, a British electronic music project
 Highlands and Islands Alliance, a defunct Scottish political party
 Lamang language, ISO 639-3 code